Joanell M. Dyrstad (born October 15, 1942) is an American politician from Minnesota was the 43rd lieutenant governor of Minnesota, serving from January 7, 1991, to January 3, 1995. She was elected with Governor Arne Carlson. In 1994, Dyrstad ran for the U.S. Senate but lost the Independent Republican primary to Rod Grams.

Biography
Born and raised in St. James, Minnesota, Dyrstad (née Sletta) spent most of her adult life in Red Wing, where she served as mayor from 1985 to 1991. While mayor, Dyrstad served on the local United Way chapter's board and was a member of the Minnesota League of Cities board. She also operated a local drugstore with her husband, Marvin. She is often credited with leading efforts to revitalize the historic riverfront of downtown Red Wing.

Though not Minnesota's first female lieutenant governor, Dyrstad was the first lieutenant governor in the state, and perhaps the nation, to deliver part of a State of the State address when she spoke for Governor Carlson in 1991.

In 1994, Dyrstad ran an aggressive campaign in the Independent Republican primary for U.S. Senate against Congressman Rod Grams. She compared Grams, a former news reporter, to bumbling fictional TV anchor Ted Baxter from the Minnesota-based TV program The Mary Tyler Moore Show. 

In the 2006 gubernatorial election, Dyrstad endorsed Independence Party nominee Peter Hutchinson over the more conservative Republican incumbent, Tim Pawlenty.

Joanell and Marvin Dyrstad have been married since 1965. They have two children, Troy and Anika.

Electoral history
1994 Race for U.S. Senate (Republican Primary)
Rod Grams (R), 58%
Joanell Dyrstad (R), 35%
Harold Stassen (R), 5%
1990 Race for Governor/Lieutenant Governor
Carlson/Dyrstad (R), 50%
Perpich/Johnson (D), 47%

See also
List of female lieutenant governors in the United States

References

Minnesota Historical Society

Lieutenant Governors of Minnesota
Mayors of places in Minnesota
Minnesota Republicans
1942 births
Living people
People from Red Wing, Minnesota
People from St. James, Minnesota
Gustavus Adolphus College alumni
Women mayors of places in Minnesota
20th-century American politicians
20th-century American women politicians
Candidates in the 1994 United States elections